Denis Tunnicliffe, Baron Tunnicliffe,  (born 17 January 1943) is a British pilot and railwayman. He is a Labour Life Peer, who has had several roles in the House of Lords ranging from a Government Whip to a Defence Spokesman . He is currently the Opposition Deputy Chief Whip.

Early life and career 
The son of Arthur and Ellen Tunnicliffe, he was educated at Henry Cavendish School in Derby and University College, London, where he graduated with a Bachelor of Science in mathematics in 1965. He was further educated at the College of Air Training in Hamble and worked then for British Overseas Airways Corporation (BOAC) and later British Airways from 1966 to 1986. Until 1972, he was co-pilot.

Since 1968, he has been married to Susan Dale. They had two sons, one now deceased.

From 1986 to 1988, Tunnicliffe was chief executive of the Aviation Division of International Leisure Group. For London Underground, he was managing director between 1988 and 1998 and chairman between 1998 and 2000. Tunnicliffe was chief executive of London Regional Transport from 1998 to 2000 and chairman of the United Kingdom Atomic Energy Authority from 2002 to 2004. Since 2003 he is chairman of the Rail Safety and Standards Board. For the British Airline Pilots' Association, he was a member between 1966 and 1972, and local council member from 1969 to 1972.

Tunnicliffe is Trustee of Homerton College, Cambridge and council member of Royal Holloway, University of London.

In the 1993 Birthday Honours he was appointed a Commander of the Order of the British Empire (CBE).

In Parliament 
He was created a life peer as Baron Tunnicliffe, of Bracknell in the County of Berkshire on 2 June 2004.

Since his introduction to the House of Lords he has served in many positions namely as a Lord in Waiting for the last two years of the Labour Government.

Following the 2010 General Election he was appointed as Opposition Deputy Chief Whip under Lord Bassam of Brighton while briefly serving as the Opposition Spokesman for Defence. He continues to serve as Deputy Chief Whip as well as a general spokesman  for a range of issues, as is the custom for Whips in the House of Lords.

References

1943 births
Alumni of University College London
Alumni of Hamble College of Air Training
Commanders of the Order of the British Empire
Tunnicliffe
Living people
People associated with Royal Holloway, University of London
Life peers created by Elizabeth II